Real Club de Polo de Barcelona is a country club in Barcelona, Spain. Established in 1897, it had 9000 members at the time of the 1992 Summer Olympics. Normally used for polo, field hockey, tennis, squash, and swimming by its members, the club was the venue for the Olympic equestrian competition (dressage, jumping, and the eventing finals) and the riding portion of the modern pentathlon events.

Trophies

Men's hockey
División de Honor de Hockey: 15
1958, 1959, 1970, 1977, 1978, 1980, 1981, 1982, 2002, 2003, 2008, 2013, 2014, 2015, 2018
European Cup: 1
2003–04
Copa del Rey: 31
1916, 1917, 1922, 1924, 1925, 1929, 1941, 1957, 1958, 1959, 1960, 1962, 1964, 1970, 1974, 1976, 1979, 1980, 1981, 1982, 1983, 1989, 1996, 2003, 2008, 2013, 2014, 2016, 2017, 2019, 2020

Women's hockey
División de Honor Femenina: 9
1964, 1965, 1972, 1973, 1977, 1978, 1979, 2003, 2006
Copa de la Reina: 3
2003, 2004, 2005

Current squad

Men's squad
Head coach: Katie Allen

References

External links
1992 Summer Olympics official report. Volume 2. pp. 221–24.
Official website 

 
1897 establishments in Catalonia
Field hockey clubs established in 1897
Venues of the 1992 Summer Olympics
Olympic equestrian venues
Olympic modern pentathlon venues
Sports venues in Barcelona
Sports clubs in Barcelona
Catalan field hockey clubs
Polo clubs